Nappalatthanar (Tamil: நப்பாலத்தனார்) was a poet of the Sangam period, to whom a sole verse of the Sangam literature has been attributed, in addition to verse 47 of the Tiruvalluva Maalai.

Contribution to the Sangam literature
Nappalatthanar has written a sole Sangam verse—verse 240 of the Natrinai—besides verse 47 of the Tiruvalluva Maalai.

Views on Valluvar and the Kural
Nappalatthanar opines about Valluvar and the Kural text thus:

See also

 Sangam literature
 List of Sangam poets
 Tiruvalluva Maalai

Notes

References

 

Tamil philosophy
Tamil poets
Sangam poets
Tiruvalluva Maalai contributors